Sujanpur is a city and municipal council in the Pathankot district of the Indian state of Punjab.

Sujanpur may also refer to:

 Tira Sujanpur, a town and municipal council in Hamirpur, Himachal Pradesh, India
 Sujanpur, Himachal Pradesh Assembly constituency
 Sujanpur, Punjab Assembly constituency